The 2018 Superliga Colombiana (known as the 2018 Superliga Águila for sponsorship purposes) was the seventh edition of the Superliga Colombiana. It was contested by the champions of the 2017 Categoría Primera A season from 31 January to 7 February 2018. Millonarios defeated Atlético Nacional 2–1 on aggregate to win their first Superliga title.

Teams

Matches

First leg

Second leg

Notes

References

External links
Dimayor

Superliga Colombiana
Superliga Colombiana 2018
Superliga Colombiana
Superliga Colombiana